Adam Saltsman, also known as Adam Atomic, is an American indie video game designer best known for creating the endless runner Canabalt. He is a founder of Semi Secret Software and Finji video game studios.

Career

Flixel (2008-11)
Saltsman produced an open-source game development library for Adobe Flash called Flixel. Saltsman discussed the use of Flixel as a medium for new developers, and used it to develop Canabalt. The video game development tool Stencyl makes use of the Flixel framework.

Gravity Hook (2008) 

Saltsman developed the browser game Gravity Hook in August 2008, which is a vertically scrolling video game in which the player attempts to  use a futuristic grappling hook to climb out of an underground, secret base in order to reach the surface. The game was remade into Gravity Hook HD for browser and iOS in 2010.

Canabalt (2009)
 Saltsman developed the endless runner Canabalt in 2009, where an anonymous runner moves in one direction and is able to jump and slide upon landing. Boing Boing described the game as a "one-button action-opus". It was made in response to Experimental Gameplay's "Bare Minimum" challenge. The game's viral success was a surprise to him, and he later felt like he squandered the opportunity and audience. When asked in an interview where he imagined the running man coming from, Saltsman stated "I used to have fantasies at my old office job of running down our long, long hallway just for fun. And to literally escape. I'd forgotten about that until months after Canabalt came out. There used to be an intro cinematic that I was designing, where the character receives an email, but it was all getting in the way of the main thing". Saltsman presented the game design concept of "Time Until Death" at the 2011 IndieCade.

Hundreds (2013)

Saltsman began to collaborate with Greg Wohlwend on Hundreds. The game was Wohlwend's first as game designer, and he open sourced the game after online game sites showed no interest in purchasing it. Semi Secret's Eric Johnson found the code and made an iPad port in a weekend, beginning the collaboration. Semi Secret did not have the funds to begin a new game from scratch, so the project fit their company roadmap. Saltsman did not expect to work on the game himself, but became the primary puzzle designer. It was released on January 7, 2013 for iPhone and iPad, and on June 28 for Android to what video game review score aggregator Metacritic called "generally favorable" reviews. It was an honorable mention in Best Mobile Game and Nuovo Award categories of the 2012 Game Developers Conference Independent Games Festival, and an honorable mention in Excellence in Visual Art at the 2013 festival. Hundreds was also an official selection at IndieCade 2012. In January 2013, Saltsman was working on an Android release of the game.

Alphabet (2013)

Saltsman collaborated with Keita Takahashi on the title Alphabet (stylized A͈L͈P͈H͈A͈B͈E͈T͈) which was developed for the launch of LA Game Space in 2012. The experimental game was first displayed to the public by Juegos Rancheros on April 5, 2013 and was released to backers of the LA/GS Kickstarter that September. Since 2018 the title has been available for free from The Internet Archive.

Finji 

In March 2014, Saltsman re-announced Finji, a game studio that had existed since 2006 but was relaunched. Saltsman directs the studio, and his wife, Rebekah, produces and does game design. The company develops games internally and produces others. They announced four titles with the relaunch. The first, Portico, is in collaboration with Alec Holowka of Aquaria and was recently renamed from Grave. It is a 2D turn-based tactical survival game first announced in mid-2011. Players use traps to stop incoming monsters from entering a sacred gate. Finji distributed Night in the Woods, a Kickstarter-funded project by Scott Benson and Holowka. They also sell Saltsman's survival game Capsule (in collaboration with Robin Arnott). They also announced Overland, a "turn-based tactical survival game" in development with Shay Pierce of Deep Plaid Games, which Saltsman privately displayed during the 2014 Game Developers Conference. Finji has also published Tunic, developed by Andrew Shouldice and Chicory: A Colorful Tale. In June 2014, Polytron announced that it would be co-publishing the "interactive musical landscape anthology" game Panoramical with Finji. The company does not have plans to crowdfund future games.

The following is a table of games published by Finji.

References

External links 

Living people
American video game designers
Place of birth missing (living people)
Year of birth missing (living people)
Indie video game developers
Browser game developers